Tora is the surname of:

 Apisai Tora (1934–2020), Fijian politician
 Bjarte Tørå (born 1953), Norwegian politician
 James Tora (born 1956), Solomon Islands politician
 Lia Torá (1907–1972), Brazilian dancer and film actress
 Mirco Di Tora (born 1986), Italian swimmer
 Semisi Tora (born 1979), Fijian rugby league player

See also

Tola (name)
Tona (name)
Tova